The following is a summary of Down county football team's 2012 season.

Kits

Competitions

Dr McKenna Cup

Squad
Brendan McVeigh Gk,
Damien Turley,
Daniel McCartan,
Dan Gordon, 
Niall Branigan,
Aidan Branigan,
Ciarán Brannigan,
Kevin Duffen,
Conor Gavery,
Brendan McArdle,
Mark Doran,
Darren O'Hagan,
Peter Turley,
Conor Gough,
Kalum King,
Ambrose Rogers,
Aidan Carr,
Daniel Hughes,
Niall McParland,
Arthur McConville,
Brendan Coulter,
Conor Laverty,
Eoin McCartan,
Paul McComiskey,
Marcus Miskelly,
Kevin Anderson,
Liam Doyle,
Michael McAlister Gk

Fixtures

Table

National Football League Division 1

Squad
Peter Turley,
Damien Turley
Keith Quinn,
Donal O'Hare,
Marcus Miskelly,
Niall McParland,
David McKibben,
Arthur McConville,
Conor Gough,
Timmy Hanna,
Owen Costllo,
Ciaran Brannigan,
Niall Branigan,
Ryan Brady,
Kevin Anderson,
Michael McAllister,
Declan Rooney,
Ambrose Rogers,
Damien Rafferty,
Mark Poland,
Brendan McVeigh,
Kevin McKernan,
Gerard McCartan,
Eoin McCartan,
Daniel McCartan,
Brendan McArdle,
Anton McArdle,
Conor Maginn,
Conor Laverty,
Kalum King,
Daniel Hughes,
Dan Gordan,
Conor Garvey,
Kevin Duffin,
Liam Doyle,
Brendan Coulter,
Aidan Carr,
Aidan Branigan,
Paul McComiskey

Fixtures

Table

Results

Ulster Senior Football Championship

The draw for the 2012 Ulster Senior Football Championship took place on 6 October 2011.

Squad
Ambrose Rogers,
Daniel Hughes,
Kalum King,
Brendan McVeigh,
Gerard McCartan,
Declan Rooney,
Brendan McArdle,
Aidan Burns,
Kevin McKernan,
Conor Garvey,
Mark Poland,
Brendan Coulter,
Conor Maginn,
Dan Gordan,
Conor Laverty,
Daniel McCartan,
Aidan Carr,
Aidan Branigan,
Eoin McCartan,
Kevin Duffin,
Anton McArdle,
Liam Doyle,
Gerard McAnulty,
Peter Turley,
Damien Turley,
Marcus Miskelly,
Arthur McConville,
Niall McParland,
Niall Branigan,
Ciaran Brannigan,
Owen Costello,
Timmy Hanna,
Michael McAlister,
Shane Harrison,
Ben O'Reilly,
Donal O'Hare,
Darren O'Hagan

Fixtures

Rounds

Results

--

All-Ireland Senior Football Championship

Fixtures

Rounds

Results

Awards
 Ulster GAA Writers' Association Award June - Conor Laverty
 Irish News Ulster All-Star - Dan Gordan and Conor Laverty
 BBC Man of the Match v Fermanagh - Conor Laverty
 BBC Man of the Match v Monaghan - Conor Laverty
 RTÉ Man of the Match v Monaghan - Conor Laverty
 GAA Man of the Match v Tipperary - Ambrose Rogers
 GAA All Star nominations - Conor Laverty

References

Down
Gaelic
Down county football team seasons